The 2016–17 season is Koper's 23rd season in the Slovenian PrvaLiga, Slovenian top division, since the league was created. Koper compete in Slovenian PrvaLiga and Slovenian Football Cup.

Players
As of 17 July 2016

Source:FC Koper

Transfer

Pre-season and friendlies

Summer

Competitions

Overall

Overview
{| class="wikitable" style="text-align: center"
|-
!rowspan=2|Competition
!colspan=8|Record
|-
!
!
!
!
!
!
!
!
|-
| PrvaLiga

|-
| Cup

|-
! Total

PrvaLiga

League table

Results summary

Results by round

Matches

Cup

First round

Statistics

Squad statistics

Goalscorers

See also
2016–17 Slovenian PrvaLiga
2016–17 Slovenian Football Cup

References

External links
Official FC Koper website 
Twitter profile
Facebook profile
PrvaLiga profile 
Soccerway profile

Slovenian football clubs 2016–17 season